Tseveenii Jügder was a Mongolian chess player and Mongolian Chess Championship winner (1955). He was born in 1919 in Bulgan, Dornod.

Biography
In the 1950s Tseveenii Jügder was one of Mongolia's leading chess players. In 1955 he won the Mongolian Chess Championship.

Tseveenii Jügder played for Mongolia in the Chess Olympiad:
 In 1956, at first board in the 12th Chess Olympiad in Moscow (+4, =3, -9).

Tseveenii Jügder played for Mongolia in the World Student Team Chess Championship:
 In 1957, at first reserve board in the 4th World Student Team Chess Championship in Reykjavik (+2, =2, -2).

References

External links

Tseveenii Jügder chess games at 365chess.com

1919 births
Year of death missing
People from Dornod Province
Mongolian chess players
Chess Olympiad competitors
20th-century chess players